Russula medullata is a species of mushroom in the genus Russula. It was officially described by French mycologist Henri Romagnesi in 1997.

See also
List of Russula species

References

External links

medullata
Fungi described in 1997
Fungi of Europe